Patricia Nielsen (22 June 1930 – 1985) was a British swimmer. She competed in three events at the 1948 Summer Olympics.

References

1930 births
1985 deaths
British female swimmers
Olympic swimmers of Great Britain
Swimmers at the 1948 Summer Olympics
Sportspeople from London
People from Bromley
20th-century British women